John Cotton (fl. 1379–1388) was an English politician.

He was Mayor of Cambridge from September 1376 to 1378.

He was a Member (MP) of the Parliament of England for Cambridge in 1379, November 1380, October 1382, February 1383, October 1383, November 1384 and February 1388.

References

Year of birth missing
Year of death missing
English MPs 1379
People from Cambridge
English MPs November 1380
English MPs October 1382
English MPs February 1383
English MPs October 1383
English MPs November 1384
English MPs February 1388